Point Pleasant is a television series that first aired on the Fox Network in January 2005. It was cancelled in March 2005 due to low ratings.

Point Pleasant boasted many of the same crew behind the scenes as Fox's other shortly withdrawn series, Tru Calling. In fact, Point Pleasant received the greenlight just three days after production ceased on Tru Calling. 13 episodes were filmed, but due to low ratings, Fox only aired episodes 1–8 in the United States. Episodes 9–11 aired in Sweden, all episodes aired in New Zealand on back to back weekdays in mid-2007, all episodes aired in The Netherlands in 2008 and the last two episodes are included on the DVD release.

Most of the music featured in the series was replaced for the DVD release due to licensing issues.

The show's executive producer was Marti Noxon, who worked closely with Joss Whedon for several seasons on Buffy the Vampire Slayer. For this reason, Point Pleasant initially drew in many of that show's fans, but Point Pleasant had a distinct "soapy" flavor, more in the vein of shows like Melrose Place or The O.C. than Buffy. The resulting drop in viewership eventually led to the show's cancellation. However, advocates of the show point to its gothic tone, its tempered, surprisingly subtle use of special effects, and the potential of the overall plotline as solid reasons the show should have stayed on the air. The plots emphasized humanity's self-centeredness and cruelty to one another as primal reasons for evil.

In 2009, episodes of the series were shown on the Chiller network, including the episodes never shown on Fox.

Synopsis
A young girl named Christina washes up on the shore near Point Pleasant Beach, New Jersey during a violent storm. After being resuscitated by lifeguard Jesse Parker, the girl is taken in by the family of a local doctor, the Kramers, and quickly befriends their teenage daughter, Judy. The show follows Christina's attempts to discover who she really is, and to learn what happened to her mother, who disappeared shortly after Christina was born.

It soon becomes apparent that Christina's presence has a strange, profound effect on the people around her. Emotions are heightened, repressed feelings and secret desires awakened, and inhibitions weakened, turning what once were friendly competitions into bitter rivalries, romantic rivals into violent enemies, and so on. Freak "accidents" have a way of befalling those with whom Christina becomes angry.

Sinister forces have their eye on Christina, believing it is the girl's destiny, as the "child of darkness", to "bring [the world] to its knees". Christina is the Antichrist, the child of Satan. The resulting tension between the good and evil aspects of the girl's nature provides the basis for much of the show's conflict and suspense.

Christina is plagued by terrifying visions of death and destruction, glimpses of the dark future she seems destined to help bring about. A handsome, charming stranger named Lucas Boyd arrives in town, determined to help guide Christina toward her destiny, and Jesse Parker, who has become romantically involved with Christina, discovers that he may be the only one who can prevent the girl from ushering in Armageddon. Ultimately, Jesse is able to choose between accepting Christina, which will cause her good side to prevail, or rejecting her, which will cause her evil side to prevail. He rejects her and the series ends on something of a cliffhanger with Christina leaving Point Pleasant as it is engulfed in an apocalyptic holocaust.

Cast and characters

Main

 Elisabeth Harnois as Christina Nickson: The daughter of Satan. Her name "Christina" is derived from Christ; "Old Nick" is a euphemism for the Devil and, "-son" originally meant "son of".
 Samuel Page as Jesse Parker: A lifeguard and the love interest of Christina. He is the former boyfrend of Paula. His biological father is not known.
 Grant Show as Lucas Boyd: A half-demon guardian of Christina. 
 Aubrey Dollar as Judy Kramer: Christina's best friend and her "adoptive sister".
 Dina Meyer as Amber Hargrove: A conniving real estate agent, and first friend of Lucas Boyd in Point Pleasant. 
 Cameron Richardson as Paula Hargrove: The former girlfriend of Jesse, and the potential love interest of Terry.

 Susan Walters as Meg Kramer: The mother of Judy, and adoptive mother of Christina.

 Richard Burgi as Ben Kramer: The father of Judy, adoptive father of Christina. He is doctor in Point Pleasant.

Recurring

 Clare Carey as Sarah Parker: The mother of Jesse.
 Brent Weber as Terry Burke: The best friend of Jesse, and Paula's lover.
 Alex Carter as Sheriff Logan Parker: The adoptive father of Jesse, and Point Pleasant's sheriff.
 Ned Schmidtke as Father Matthew
 John Diehl as David Burke: The father of Terry, and friend of Meg Kramer.
 Adam Busch as Wesley Feist aka Wes: Lucas Boyd's assistant
 Elizabeth Ann Bennett as Holly: The wife of Lucas Boyd who is both dead and alive.
 Marcus Coloma as Father Tomas: He is trying to help Christiana not embrace the "Dark Side", but he is secretly harboring feelings for her. 
 Elizabeth Ann Bennett as Holly
 Audrey Marie Anderson as Isabelle Kramer: Judy's deceased sister.

Notable guest stars
 James Morrison as Kingston Nickson: Raised Christina as her father before Point Pleasant.
 Aaron Paul as Mark Owens: A love interest of Judy's.
 Steven Brand as Graham: The first guardian of Jesse, and an enemy of Lucas Boyd.
 Matt Lanter as Nick: Judy's second love interest, and a second guardian of Jesse.
 Dana Davis as Lucinda: A friend of Paula's
 Aaron Norvell as Deputy Atkins
 Randy Oglesby as Father David
 Jon Hamm as Dr. George Forrester
 Wyatt Alvarez as Young Jesse Parker
 Lisa Zane as Anne Gibson: The biological mother of Christina.
 Robert Knepper as Presenter at the Dance, a half-demon past dance host
 Peter Allas as Dr. Evett

Episodes 

 Notes

References

External links 

 

2000s American horror television series
2000s American mystery television series
2000s American teen drama television series
2005 American television series debuts
2005 American television series endings
American television soap operas
Fox Broadcasting Company original programming
Demons in television
Serial drama television series
Television series by 20th Century Fox Television
Television series created by Marti Noxon
Television shows set in New Jersey
Neo-noir television series